This is a list of all tornadoes that were confirmed throughout Europe by the European Severe Storms Laboratory and local meteorological agencies during 2013. Unlike the United States, the original Fujita Scale and the TORRO scale are used to rank tornadoes across the continent.

European yearly total

January

January 2 event

January 16 event

January 17 event

January 24 event

January 27 event

February

February 2 event

February 5 event

February 7 event

February 8 event

February 9 event

February 15 event

February 19 event

February 27 event

March

March 9 event

March 10 event

March 12 event

March 31 event

April

April 1 event

April 15 event

April 27 event

May

May 3 event

May 4 event

May 7 event

May 11 event

May 12 event

May 14 event

May 18 event

May 20 event

May 22 event

May 23 event

May 24 event

May 25 event

May 26 event

May 27 event

May 29 event

May 30 event

June

June 19 event

References 

Tornadoes of 2013
 2013
Tornadoes
Tornado-related lists
2013-related lists